The  Ministry of Education is a Cabinet department in the Executive branch of the Republic of Bashkortostan government.

Ministry has a policy to Bashkir language saved and development.

Mission
The Republic of Bashkortostan Ministry of Education  is working to strengthen the Education;

Structure 
The structure of the ministry includes:

 Department of General Education and state final certification;
 Department of vocational education;
 Department of Higher Professional Education;
 Informatization Sector of Education;
 Department of rest, education and additional education.

Notes and references

External links
 http://www.morb.ru Republic of Bashkortostan Ministry of Education Official Website in Russian

Politics of Bashkortostan
Education
Bashkortostan
Indigenous education